Estavillo is a village located in the municipality of Armiñón, province of Álava (Araba), in the autonomous community of Basque Country, northern Spain.

External links
 ESTAVILLO in the Bernardo Estornés Lasa - Auñamendi Encyclopedia (Euskomedia Fundazioa) 

Populated places in Álava